Metro Toronto Works was a department within the former Regional Municipality of Metropolitan Toronto.

The department was responsible for a variety of services:

 Water filtration plants providing water to all of Metro Toronto
 Sewage treatment plants 
 Water pumping stations, water towers, and underground storage reservoirs located in Toronto and those located in York Region
 Public works projects outside of city jurisdiction
 Landfill sites - Brock Road and Keele Valley
 Waste transfer stations
 Public golf courses

These areas are now split amongst departments:

 Toronto Water (part of Toronto Works and Emergency Services Department)
 Toronto Solid Waste Management
 Toronto Parks, Forestry and Recreation Division - golf courses

Metro Works yards are now used by the City's Toronto Works and Emergency Services.

See also

Active

 Green Lane landfill

Inactive

 Beare Road Landfill - opened 1967 and closed 1983
 Keele Valley - opened 1982 and closed 2002
 Brock Road Landfills - used from 1975 to 1996 and closed 1997

Metropolitan Toronto